Elmer Lincoln Fulton (April 22, 1865 – October 4, 1939) was an American politician and a U.S. Representative from Oklahoma.

Biography
Born in Magnolia, Iowa, on April 22, 1865, Fulton was son to Jacob and Eliza Ann McAllester Fulton. He moved to Nebraska in 1870 with his parents, and they settled in Pawnee City. He attended the public schools and Tabor College, Tabor, Iowa. He studied law, and was admitted to the bar in 1895. He commenced practice at Pawnee City until he moved to Stillwater, in the Territory of Oklahoma, in 1901. There, he continued the practice of law.  He married Mabel Rinehart on March 7, 1906.

Fulton was elected as a Democrat to the Sixtieth Congress September 17, 1907, and served from November 16, 1907, when Oklahoma was admitted as a State into the Union, until March 4, 1909. He was an unsuccessful candidate for reelection in 1908 to the Sixty-first Congress, and resumed the practice of law in Oklahoma City, Oklahoma.

Appointed assistant attorney general of Oklahoma in 1919, Fulton served until 1922, when he resigned and again resumed the practice of his profession.

Death
Fulton died on October 4, 1939 (age 74 years, 165 days) in Oklahoma City, Oklahoma. He is interred at Valhalla Cemetery, St. Louis, Missouri. Senator Charles William Fulton from Oregon, was his brother.

References

External links
 

 Encyclopedia of Oklahoma History and Culture - Fulton, Elmer

1865 births
1939 deaths
Democratic Party members of the United States House of Representatives from Oklahoma
People from Harrison County, Iowa
People from Tabor, Iowa
People from Stillwater, Oklahoma
Politicians from Oklahoma City
People from Pawnee City, Nebraska
Lawyers from Oklahoma City